Apice is a comune (municipality) in the Province of Benevento in the Italian region Campania, located about 70 km northeast of Naples and about 13 km east of Benevento.

Apice borders the following municipalities: Ariano Irpino, Bonito, Buonalbergo, Calvi, Melito Irpino, Mirabella Eclano, Montecalvo Irpino, Paduli, San Giorgio del Sannio, Sant'Arcangelo Trimonte, Venticano.

References

External links
Official website

Cities and towns in Campania
Articles which contain graphical timelines